Jared Bednar (born February 28, 1972) is a Canadian professional ice hockey coach and former player. He is the current head coach of the Colorado Avalanche of the National Hockey League (NHL). He previously coached the Lake Erie Monsters of the American Hockey League, leading them to a Calder Cup championship in 2015–16. He also led the South Carolina Stingrays of the ECHL to a Kelly Cup championship in the 2008–09 season. Bednar won the Stanley Cup with Colorado in 2022, becoming the first coach to win the current ECHL, AHL, and NHL trophies (Kelly, Calder, and Stanley Cup respectively).

Playing career
Bednar played junior hockey with the Western Hockey League's Saskatoon Blades, Spokane Chiefs, Medicine Hat Tigers, and Prince Albert Raiders, from 1990 to 1993, playing in 152 games with 520 combined penalty minutes, establishing himself as a physical player. After going undrafted by the NHL, Bednar made his professional debut during the 1993–94 season, with the Huntington Blizzard of the East Coast Hockey League (ECHL). He played three seasons with the team, posting a career high in points during the 1994–95 season, with 45 points in 64 games.

Bednar joined the ECHL's South Carolina Stingrays halfway through the 1995–96 season, posting 24 points and 126 penalty minutes in his first 39 games. From 1995 to 1998, he played mostly with the Stingrays, with small stints in the American Hockey League (AHL) with the St. John's Maple Leafs and Rochester Americans. He played the 1998–99 season with the Grand Rapids Griffins of the International Hockey League (IHL), racking up 21 points and 220 PIMS in 71 games with the Griffins. Bednar re-joined the Stingrays for the 1999–2000 season and played two more seasons with the Rays. He announced his retirement after the 2001–02 season.

Coaching career
After retiring as a player, Bednar remained with the Stingrays as an assistant coach from 2002 to 2007. After head coach Jason Fitzsimmons stepped down, Bednar was named his successor for the 2007–08 season. His first season as coach was extremely successful, with the Stingrays winning 47 games in the regular season, and making it to the American Conference finals in the playoffs. After another successful season in 2008–09, the Stingrays won the Kelly Cup, giving Bednar his first championship as a coach in only his second season.

After winning the Cup, Bednar stepped down as head coach of the Stingrays to become assistant coach of the Abbotsford Heat of the AHL for the 2009–10 season. He was then the head coach of the AHL's Peoria Rivermen from 2010 through 2012.

The Columbus Blue Jackets hired Bednar as an assistant coach for their minor league AHL affiliate, the Springfield Falcons, beginning with the 2012–13 season. After serving in this role for two seasons, he was promoted to head coach following the promotion of Brad Larsen to Columbus' staff. For the 2015–16 season, Columbus shifted their AHL affiliation to the Lake Erie Monsters in Cleveland. Bednar followed the affiliation to Cleveland and continued as head coach. Lake Erie went 15–2 in the 2016 Calder Cup playoffs to capture the franchise's first championship and the first for the city of Cleveland since the original Cleveland Barons won the 1964 Calder Cup. He was later rewarded by the Blue Jackets with a two-year contract extension through to the 2018–19 season on July 19, 2016.

On August 25, 2016, Bednar was named head coach of the Colorado Avalanche of the National Hockey League (NHL), replacing Patrick Roy. Bednar walked into a difficult situation. He was hired less than a month before training camp, and did not have nearly enough time to implement his own system. He also didn't have enough time to hire his own staff, and was forced to retain Roy's assistants. Despite having talented players, such as Nathan MacKinnon, Gabriel Landeskog and Matt Duchene on the roster, the team never recovered from a 4-21-1 December and January and slumped to only 48 points, the worst record in the league. It was also one of the worst records for a non-expansion team since 1967, and the worst since the team moved from Quebec City in 1995. 

Bednar didn't take long to bring the Avalanche back to respectability. In his second season in Denver, Bednar guided the team to a 47-point improvement. The team faced some adversity early in the season with the distraction of Duchene's public trade request. Following the trade, Bednar guided the team to one of the hottest second half records, returning them to the playoffs for the first time in four years. After the Avalanche's first round exit in six games to the Nashville Predators, Bednar was signed to a one-year contract extension on April 23, 2018. A few days after signing a new contract, Bednar was nominated for the Jack Adams Award.

In Bednar's third season coaching the Avalanche, he led the team to back-to-back playoff appearances for the first time since Joel Quenneville in 2004-05 and 2005–06. The Avalanche defeated the Calgary Flames 4–1 in the Western Conference's First Round, and then were defeated in the Second Round in seven games by the San Jose Sharks. On July 9, 2019, Bednar signed a two-year contract extension. In 2021–22, after earning a franchise-record 119 points, Bednar led the Avalanche to the third Stanley Cup in franchise history when his team defeated the Tampa Bay Lightning, who were defending back to back Stanley Cup champions and had won 11 straight postseason series. Notably, they only lost four of their 20 playoff games (16–4).

Mainly on the strength of the 2021-22 season, Bednar is the second-winningest coach in Nordiques/Avalanche history, behind only Michel Bergeron. He has the most wins of any coach in the Colorado portion of franchise history.

Career statistics

Head coaching record

 Season shortened due to the COVID-19 pandemic during the 2019–20 season. Playoffs were played in August 2020 with a different format.

References

External links

1972 births
Living people
Anaheim Bullfrogs players
Canadian ice hockey coaches
Canadian ice hockey defencemen
Colorado Avalanche coaches
Grand Rapids Griffins (IHL) players
Huntington Blizzard players
Ice hockey people from Saskatchewan
Medicine Hat Tigers players
Prince Albert Raiders players
Rochester Americans players
Saskatoon Blades players
South Carolina Stingrays coaches
South Carolina Stingrays players
Spokane Chiefs players
Sportspeople from Yorkton
Springfield Falcons coaches
St. John's Maple Leafs players
Stanley Cup championship-winning head coaches